Taha Mikati (born in 1944) is a Lebanese billionaire businessman, the brother of fellow billionaire and current prime minister of Lebanon Najib Mikati. He is the co-founder of Investcom, the M1 Group, and the Mikati Foundation.

Personal life
He earned a bachelor's degree from the American University of Beirut, Lebanon.

Career
In 1979, he founded Arabian Construction Company (ACC), headquartered in Abu Dhabi, and one of the largest construction companies in the Middle East. Together with his brother Najib, Taha Mikati founded the Lebanese telecom operator Investcom in the 1980s.

Personal life
He is married, with three children, and lives in Beirut, Lebanon. His son, Azmi Mikati, is the CEO of M1 Group. In July 2018 he purchased Cypriot citizenship.

References

Lebanese billionaires
20th-century Lebanese businesspeople
20th-century Cypriot businesspeople
Living people
Lebanese Muslims
Cypriot Muslims
People from Tripoli, Lebanon
Mikati family
American University of Beirut alumni
1944 births
Naturalized citizens of Cyprus
Cypriot billionaires